Trabala viridana, the Sunda green Vishnu-moth, is a moth of the family Lasiocampidae. The species was first described by James John Joicey and George Talbot in 1917. It is found in Sumatra, Borneo and Peninsular Malaysia.

References

Lasiocampidae